On March 17, 1983, a significant severe weather event affected the southern Florida peninsula, including the Miami metropolitan area. A total of at least five tornadoes affected the region; while as many as 17 were reported, only two were confirmed in the official National Weather Service records. An F1 tornado also affected Naples and Golden Gate. Additionally, unconfirmed tornadoes affected an RV park southeast of East Naples, as well as the Stuart and Jupiter areas, respectively.

Background
On Thursday, March 17, 1983, surface weather analysis indicated that a large and intense low-pressure area over the Gulf of Mexico was producing gale-force winds over the southern Florida peninsula. Above the surface, a strong low-level jet stream coupled with a large negative geopotential height—with heights measuring standard deviations below normal—produced sufficient lifting and wind shear, both conditions conducive to severe weather. Due to the favorable conditions for severe weather, the National Weather Service office in Miami issued a tornado watch for South Florida, effective the morning of March 17. The watch was canceled at 9:30 a.m. EST (14:30 UTC), but then was reissued and extended to 5:00 p.m. (22:00 UTC) as more storms formed over the Everglades. Forecasters expected the low pressure area in the Gulf of Mexico to bring a cold front across Florida on Friday, March 18.

The tornadoes occurred during a strong occurrence of El Niño—a condition known to enhance severe weather over Florida.

Confirmed tornadoes

At least three unconfirmed tornadoes were reported, two of them in Martin County:

•A tornado reportedly affected the Hitching Post RV Travel Resort, near Naples Manor, causing $6,000 in damage to one trailer, tearing loose a carport from another, and felling trees and utility lines. Electricity was disrupted for four hours, leaving 300 residents powerless.
•Another possible tornado about 8:20 a.m. (13:20 UTC) overturned a vehicle on the Bee-Line Highway north of Indiantown Road, west of Jupiter, injuring one woman. The person was transported to a hospital, where she was treated and released.
•A third possible tornado touched down around 8:35 a.m. (13:35 UTC) in Stuart, damaging trees, downing branches, and destroying portions of tree trunks, along with a screened greenhouse. Florida Power and Light crews removed branches from electrical wires.

March 17 event

Everglades–Trailtown–Sunrise–Lauderhill–North Lauderdale–Margate–Pompano Beach–Lighthouse Point, Florida

The second tornado of the day was a long-tracked tornado that was probably a family of up to five tornadoes. The tornado, or the first member of its family, touched down near Trailtown at about 7:49 am, though it may have formed farther southwest in the Everglades, as one person reportedly sighted a tornado as early as 7:30 am. Upon touching down, the tornado damaged two bungalows owned by Seminole Indians. Phone service was disrupted at the service station, where losses were estimated near $30,000. Two vehicles, one of which was a refueling van, were overturned, injuring two people. Additionally, electrical wires were damaged and a dumpster was thrown .

Subsequently, the tornado struck the communities of Sunrise, Lauderhill, North Lauderdale, Margate, Pompano Beach, and Lighthouse Point. It first hit several homes and a recreation center in Sunrise, causing extensive damage. As it moved through Sunrise, the tornado downed power poles, wires, screen enclosures, trees, and mailboxes. Doors at the Sunrise city hall were blown open, allowing debris inside that covered the first floor of the building. Damage was widespread throughout the city, particularly along and near Oakland Park Boulevard. At least three funnel clouds were reported in Sunrise, and at least one tornado touchdown was alleged. Windows were broken in hundreds of homes, while trees and power lines were prostrated. The mayor of the town of Sunrise, John Lomelo, declared a state of emergency in the town at 8:15 am, upon hearing of damage to city hall and across the city. Next, the tornado blew a porch from a home in Lauderhill. In North Lauderdale, the tornado damaged 30 to 40 homes in a four-block area, blowing awnings loose and uprooting trees. In Margate, the tornado affected the 600 and 700 blocks along SW 51st Avenue. A home was unroofed, another home lost most of its roof, and trees and power lines were downed. The tornado tore a bedroom door from its hinges, broke glass, and snapped a  Norfolk Island pine tree in half.

After hitting Margate, the tornado struck the Pompano Beach service plaza on Florida's Turnpike, overturning an 18-wheeler tractor trailer, uprooting trees, and blowing away signs. After hitting the service plaza, the tornado continued northeast to Golf View Estates, a mobile-home park north of Palm-Aire Country Club, damaging about 15 mobile homes, of which six to eight had major damage. Several mobile homes were unroofed. Near the intersection of Copans Road and Northeast Third Avenue, the tornado struck another mobile-home park, where its winds overturned a mobile home and moved another off its foundation. Trees in the park were snapped "like toothpicks," and a downed tree landed on a mobile home. Nearby, the tornado also broke glass in a two-story home. As it continued across north Pompano Beach, the tornado destroyed a satellite dish at a restaurant. The tornado continued northeast to Lighthouse Point, where a department store on Federal Highway had its roof damaged. Flying debris from the store also damaged nearby apartments. Nearby, windows were shattered in a public library, and a supermarket delivery truck carrying frozen food was overturned. The Lighthouse Point section of the path was described as having been being done by a separate tornado.

Non-tornadic effects
Unusually cool temperatures in the upper levels of the atmosphere contributed to large hail in portions of South Florida, including the Miami area. In Miami Beach, hail larger than marble size fell, causing cuts and bruises to one person, who was treated for minor injuries. The heavy rains caused traffic congestion, and several accidents occurred. Severe winds were also reported elsewhere in the state, particularly near Daytona Beach. In Broward County, the strong winds downed live power lines and smashed cars' windows.

See also
List of North American tornadoes and tornado outbreaks

Notes

References

Sources

M
M
M
M
March 1983 events in the United States
1983 natural disasters in the United States